Sunset Pass may refer to:

 Sunset Pass, a Western novel by Zane Grey, initially serialized in 1928, and its film adaptations:
 Sunset Pass (1929 film), a lost film
 Sunset Pass (1933 film), starring Randolph Scott
 Sunset Pass (1946 film)
 Sunset Pass (Arizona), Coconino County, Arizona, United States
 Battle of Sunset Pass, fought in November 1874 during the Yavapai War
 Sunset Pass (Alberta), Canada - see List of passes of the Rocky Mountains